Czech Republic–France are the current and historical relationship between the Czech Republic and France. The first diplomatic contacts between the two countries date back to the Middle Ages.

France was the first country to recognize Czechoslovakia on 28 October 1918. France supported the signing of the Little Entente and consequently signed the Treaty of Alliance and Friendship between France and Czechoslovakia on 25 January 1924.

Both countries are full members of NATO and of the European Union. Since 1999, the Czech Republic is also an observer in the Francophonie.

Education
There is a French international school in Prague, Lycée français de Prague.

Resident diplomatic missions 
 Czech Republic has an embassy in Paris.
 France has an embassy in Prague.

See also
 Embassy of France, Prague
 Czechs in France
 Frenchs in the Czech Republic

References

External links
 French Foreign Ministry about relations with the Czech Republic

 
France
Bilateral relations of France